Overton may refer to:

Places

Canada
 Overton, Nova Scotia

United Kingdom
 Overton, Aberdeen, a location
 Overton, Frodsham, a location in Cheshire
 Overton, Malpas, Cheshire
 Overton, Gloucestershire, a hamlet in the parish of Arlingham
 Overton, Greenock, Inverclyde
 Overton, Hampshire
 Overton, Lancashire
 Overton, North Yorkshire
 Overton, Shropshire
 Overton, Staffordshire, a location
 Overton, Swansea
 Overton, West Yorkshire
 Overton, a settlement in Cunninghamhead, Perceton and Annick Lodge, Ayrshire
 Overton, an area of Halfway, South Lanarkshire
 Overton Down, an experimental archaeology site
 Overton or Overton-on-Dee, Wrexham
 Cold Overton, Leicestershire
 Market Overton, Rutland
 West Overton, Wiltshire

United States
 Overton, Missouri
 Overton, Nebraska
 Overton, Nevada
 Overton, Ohio
 Overton, Texas
 Overton, Virginia
 Overton County, Tennessee
 Overton Township, Bradford County, Pennsylvania
 West Overton, Pennsylvania

Other
 Overton (name), including a list of people with the name
 Overton Formation, England
 Overton Islands (Nevada), United States
 Overton Period in British archaeology
 Overton Prize in computational biology
 Overton window, a concept in political theory
 USS Overton (DD-239), a World War II US Navy destroyer

See also

 Overtones (disambiguation)
 Overtown (disambiguation)